James Kelso may refer to:

James Kelso (footballer) (1869–1900), Scottish footballer
Jim Kelso, also known as James Kelso (1910–1987), Scottish footballer
Jimmy Kelso (1910–?), Australian professional feather/light/welterweight boxer

See also
Jamie Kelso (born 1948), American white supremacist and member of the Sea Org